Magni is a fictional character appearing in American comic books published by Marvel Comics. The character was adapted from Magni, a character in Norse mythology, by Dan Jurgens. The character exists in an alternate future in which Thor rules over the entire Earth.

Publication History
Magni Thorson debuted in Thor vol. 2 #50 (August 2002) and was created by Dan Jurgens.
The character is based on the Norse mythology deity Magni .

Fictional character biography
Magni was born into a tumultuous New Asgard  to Thor Odinson and Amora the Enchantress.While he was still just an infant, Magni's life was threatened by Balder's betrayal during the human resistance's raid led by Captain America. While Thor fought the resistance fighters, Balder got a hold of Magni and threatened to kill him if Thor didn't stop his subjugation of humanity. Magni's adoptive uncle Loki saved his life by killing Balder. Thor, no longer restrained by fear for his son's life, killed all of the remaining intruders himself.

Magni grew up to be much like his father, both in personality and appearance (though his hair was red, unlike his father's blond). While Thor oversaw matters from New Asgard's throne, in fact, Magni often traveled through the kingdom helping humans in danger, much as Thor had done as a superhero. Although Magni loved his father dearly, he often disagreed with the way he allowed Loki to treat the humans under his rule. He still followed his father out of loyalty.

However,that began to change when Magni met and befriended Jordahl, a mortal girl whom Thialfi had rescued upon arriving in the year 2170. Jordahl bumped into Magni while on the run from Loki's security forces; after dismissing the guards, Magni spent the day with Jordahl. Through her Magni caught a glimpse of what the humans thought of his father's regime. He was disturbed to find that many of the humans feared the gods and even more disturbed to find that their fear was warranted as, a short time later, he joined the Warriors Three and Thialfi on a mission to quell a rebellion in one of the villages. Magni was shocked and outraged at the Warriors Three's conduct as they began brutally murdering humans without even trying to find a peaceful solution. He ordered the Warriors to lay down their weapons just as one of the villagers revealed himself to be a fanatical suicide bomber. Magni rushed to smother the blast of the bomber's explosive vest and succeeded, but the events he witnessed would trouble him greatly.

Afterwards Thialfi, who was already  convinced that Thor and the Asgardians needed to leave Earth, confronted Magni and urged him to see the error of his father's ways. Magni accused Thialfi of treason but showed the extent of his doubts when he did not strike Thialfi down or report him for it. Magni leaves Thialfi and goes to visit Jordahl, only to find her house in ruins and a witness claiming that Magni himself had destroyed the house and had Jordahl taken to a reconditioning camp. Magni quickly realized that Loki had impersonated him using his magic and rushed to the reconditioning camp. He found Jordahl and destroyed the camp, and his doubts about the righteousness of New Asgard grew much deeper.

Magni went to see Sif, whom Thor had banished from New Asgard years earlier, for advice. She told him about Thor's past as a noble hero while Asgard was still at its peak under Odin. Then she told him about the day Asgard fell, the same day she was banished from New Asgard. She revealed that her crime was daring to oppose Thor, Amora, and Loki in their plans for domination of Earth. Magni left Sif and returned to the royal palace, where he received word of Thialfi and Kya's failed assassination attempt on Thor. He witnessed the beginning of Kya's execution and would have tried to rescue her, but she used magic to speak to him telepathically and told him not to. After Kya's body was killed her soul led Magni to Mjolnir. He found himself able to pick the hammer up and, after learning to use it partly by instinct and partly under Sif's tutelage, he returned to the royal palace intending to test his father's purity of heart—if Thor could lift the hammer, Magni reasoned, his rule must be just and his actions righteous; if not, Magni considered that he may have to fight his father himself. When he challenged Thor to lift Mjolnir, however, Thor stalled, well aware that his murder of Jake Olson over 150 years earlier had rendered him unworthy. While Magni and Thor argued, Desak the god-slayer returned. After a pitched battle in which Magni was critically injured and several other gods were killed, Thor found himself able to lift Mjolnir again thanks to his pure intentions to defend his family and undo the wrongs Loki had done. Thor killed Desak and used the Odinforce to freeze time. He wished Magni a heartfelt farewell and promised he would never forget him, then returned to the past. With Tarene's help, he warned his younger self to ensure that the future he had experienced would never come about. Magni, along with everything after that branching point, ceased to exist.

Powers and abilities
Magni was an Asgardian whose incredibly dense body granted him a high resistance to injury. His Asgardian physiology granted him great stamina, quick reflexes, an extremely long life span, and immunity to all Earthly diseases, toxins, and some magic. Magni's position as the Norse god of strength granted him superhuman strength even greater than that of his father Thor (he effortlessly lifted and dropped a tower on Desak).

As prince of New Asgard and a warrior in its service, Magni received training in the Asgardian arts of war granting him a high degree of proficiency in armed and unarmed combat.
After gaining Mjolnir, Magni received a portion of Thor's powers.

Weapons and equipment
Magni wore a suit of Asgardian armor similar to the one his father Thor wore during his early days as lord of Asgard. Magni occasionally used one of New Asgard's many winged horses for transportation.

Magni gained possession of his father's legendary hammer Mjolnir, which had several enchantments. Magni demonstrated the ability to throw the hammer and have it magically return to him, fly by throwing it and holding onto its leather thong, and create dimensional portals. Upon gaining Mjolnir, Magni discovered that he instinctively knew how to use it for basic things. The lady Sif instructed him on how to traverse dimensions with it. Still, his proficiency with the hammer may be assumed to be far less than his father's.

Before gaining Mjolnir, Magni favored various types of axes in combat.

Fictional characters with superhuman durability or invulnerability
Marvel Comics Asgardians
Norse mythology in Marvel Comics
Marvel Comics characters with superhuman strength

References

External Links
Magni at Marvel Database

Magni at Marvel